Joseph Long or Joe Long may refer to:

 Joseph Long (actor), Italian-British screen actor
 Joseph Long (bishop) (1800–1869), American evangelical bishop
 Joseph Long (mayor), mayor of Riverside, California, United States
 Joe Long (1941–2021), American bass guitarist
 Joe Long (American football) (born 1989), American football player
 Joe Long (golfer) (born 1997), English golfer